Baley Nunatak (‘Nunatak Baley’ \'nu-na-tak ba-'ley\) is the rocky hill rising to 632 m in the southeast foothills of Mancho Buttress on the north side of Aitkenhead Glacier, on Trinity Peninsula in Graham Land, Antarctica.

The nunatak is named after the settlement of Baley in Northwestern Bulgaria.

Location
German-British mapping in 1996.

Maps
 Trinity Peninsula. Scale 1:250000 topographic map No. 5697. Institut für Angewandte Geodäsie and British Antarctic Survey, 1996.
 Antarctic Digital Database (ADD). Scale 1:250000 topographic map of Antarctica. Scientific Committee on Antarctic Research (SCAR), 1993–2016.

References
 Baley Nunatak. SCAR Composite Antarctic Gazetteer
 Bulgarian Antarctic Gazetteer. Antarctic Place-names Commission. (details in Bulgarian, basic data in English)

Notes

External links
 Baley Nunatak. Copernix satellite image

Nunataks of Trinity Peninsula
Bulgaria and the Antarctic